Ever Since Eve may refer to:

 Ever Since Eve (1921 film), an American silent drama film starring Shirley Mason, Herbert Heyes and Eva Gordon
 Ever Since Eve (1934 film), an American drama film
 Ever Since Eve (1937 film), an American romantic comedy film starring Marion Davies and Robert Montgomery